Army School of Logistics is located at Clappenburg, Trincomalee, Sri Lanka. Established on 9 May 2011, to provide academic and training programs in logistics science and management science for both Commissioned Officer and Non Commissioned Officers.

Courses
 Logistics Staff Course (LSC) - Accredited to the General Sir John Kotelawala Defence University for the Master of Business Administration in Logistics Management.
 Junior Officers' Logistics Course 
 Quartermaster Commission Courses (carried out in conjunction with Volunteer Force Training School)
 Senior Non Commissioned Officers' Logistics Course

See also
Defence Services Command and Staff College
Officer Career Development Centre
Army Logistics University

References

External links 
Army School of Logistics

Logistics 
2011 establishments in Sri Lanka
Staff colleges in Sri Lanka
Business schools in Sri Lanka
Educational institutions established in 2011
Education in Eastern Province, Sri Lanka
Colleges affiliated to General Sir John Kotelawala Defence University
Graduate schools in Sri Lanka